Cave is a town and comune in the Latium region of Italy,  southeast of Rome. As of 2011 its population was of 10,421.

History

The town was mentioned first in 998 AD, and was later a fief of the Colonna family. In 1482 it was besieged by Pope Sixtus IV and obliged to surrender. It is especially known for the Treaty of Cave, signed on 12 September 1557 by plenipotentiaries of Pope Paul IV and Fernando Álvarez de Toledo, the Spanish viceroy of Naples.

Geography
Cave borders with Castel San Pietro Romano, Genazzano, Palestrina, Rocca di Cave, and Valmontone. It counts the hamlets (frazioni) of Collepalme and San Bartolomeo.

References

Lazio, Touring Club Italiano, 2005.

External links

 Cave official website

Cities and towns in Lazio